Domain Creek is a stream in the Unorganized Part of Kenora District in Northwestern Ontario, Canada. It is in the Hudson Bay drainage basin, is a right tributary of the Rostoul River, and is within Woodland Caribou Provincial Park.

Course
The creek begins at the west end of Domain Lake and flows west to its mouth at the northwest side of Hansen Lake on the Rostoul River. The Rostoul River flows via the Gammon River, the Bloodvein River, Lake Winnipeg, and the Nelson River to Hudson Bay.

References

Rivers of Kenora District